Letalnica bratov Gorišek is one of the two largest ski flying hills in the world and the biggest of eight hills located at the Planica Nordic Centre in Planica, Slovenia.

It was built in 1969 and is named after the original constructors and brothers Vlado and Janez Gorišek. Since its opening, a total of 28 world records were set at the venue.

The first FIS Ski Flying World Championships were organized on the hill in 1972. The rule was abolished in 1994.

Letalnica bratov Gorišek is a regular venue of the FIS Ski Jumping World Cup, and has hosted the FIS Ski Flying World Championships on seven occasions, most recently in 2020. Since 2012, it also hosts the Red Bull 400 world series, the world's steepest 400-metre race. The world's steepest zip line with an average incline of 38 degrees opened at the hill in September 2015.

During the Ski Flying World Championships in 1985, the venue's highest all-time attendance was recorded when a total of 150,000 people gathered over three days.

History

1969–1972: Opening and the first World Championships 
Velikanka bratov Gorišek (original name) was planned, constructed and developed by Slovenian constructors, engineers and brothers, Vlado and Janez Gorišek. At the time, a lead engineer of Planica was Stano Pelan, who proposed to enlarge Bloudkova velikanka; however, Vlado Gorišek suggested to build a completely new venue instead. In the mid-1960s, Janez Gorišek was working as an engineer in Libya, where he prepared a plan and profile for a new hill. Construction began in 1967 and was completed by the end of 1968. During the construction, Janez was still working in Libya, so his older brother Vlado was fully in charge of the construction site. Initially, the construction point was at K153 with a 145-metre long inrun.

On 6 March 1969, two weeks before the competition, a hill test with trial jumper was made. The next day, the world record was tied and improved three times, by Jiří Raška (156 and 164 metres) and Bjørn Wirkola (160 metres). Jiří Raška won the three-day event.

In 1972, the hill hosted the first FIS Ski Flying World Championships. Swiss ski jumper Walter Steiner became the first ski flying world champion in a three-day competition, which attracted around 110,000 spectators.

1974–1979: Steiner, Norčič and World Championships 
On 15 March 1974, the second KOP Ski Flying Week competition started. In the last day of competition, Steiner confirmed his domination through the whole weekend and won in Planica for the second consecutive time.

In 1977, the third KOP Ski Flying Week competition was held. Reinhold Bachler from Austria won the three-day competition with the best round from each day counted into the final result.

In 1979, Letalnica bratov Gorišek hosted the fifth ski flying World Championships.

1985–1987: Record-breaking attendance with Nykänen
In 1984, to celebrate the 50th anniversary of Planica, the organizing committee decided to modernize the hill. Major renovation works were carried out in the summer and autumn of 1984, with the Yugoslav Army personnel, volunteers and different working organizations helping at the construction site under the command of Gorišek brothers. 1,500 cubic metres of material was excavated and filled into the landing zone. They also excavated 300 cubic metres of material from the inrun. The old wooden tower was replaced by a steel one, and the take-off table was pushed back for five metres.

In 1985, the eighth ski flying World Championships were held in Planica, with the venue's highest all-time total attendance record of 150,000 people, and the single-event record of 80,000 people. Three world records were set during the event, by Mike Holland (186 metres) and Matti Nykänen (187 and 191 metres). Nykänen has also won the World Championship. In 1986, a new rule was instituted by the International Ski Federation that awarded no additional points for jumps over 191 metres due to safety reasons.

In the 1987 season, Letalnica bratov Gorišek hosted the World Cup event for the first time. The next day, Polish ski jumper Piotr Fijas set the last parallel style world record on the first day of competition when he jumped  in the third round, which was cancelled and repeated right after his jump. His world record was officially recognized seven years later.

1991: Kiessewetter with the all-time longest parallel jump 

1994: First jump over 200 metres 

1997–2003: Peterka, ski jumping hysteria in Slovenia and more world records
In 1997, ski jumping hysteria spread all over Slovenia due to Primož Peterka, who was battling with Dieter Thoma for the first Slovenian overall title. Over 120,000 people gathered in three days, with over 60,000 people alone on the decisive Saturday when two world records (210 and 212 metres) were set by Espen Bredesen and Lasse Ottesen, respectively. Peterka won the overall title.

In 1999, the four-day event was attended by over 80,000 people.

In 2003, four world records were set. Over 120,000 visitors gathered in four days.

2005–2010: Four world records in one day and adjustments

In 2010, Letalnica got the new chairlift, renovated judge tower, landing zone widened, profile adjusted, and take-off angle lowered to keep competitors closer to the ground. All this was needed to fulfill the International Ski Federation requirements to host the 2010 Ski Flying World Championships where Simon Ammann became world champion.

2015–present: Renovations, Prevc's record-breaking season and a new hill record 
Between 2013 and 2015, the hill underwent a major renovation. A new profile was drawn by Janez Gorišek with the help of his son Sebastjan Gorišek, who is also a constructor. The hill's new construction point was at K200 and the hill size at HS225. They built a completely new concrete inrun, replacing the old steel construction. The take-off table was moved five metres higher and pushed back for twelve metres compared to the old one.

The battle for the 2014–15 World Cup overall title between Severin Freund and Peter Prevc lasted until the last jump of the season, which concluded at the newly renovated venue in March 2015. Freund took the overall title since he had more wins during the season, although they had the same number of points.

In 2016, Prevc took the overall title in a record-breaking season in which he accumulated 15 wins, with a total of 111,000 people gathering in five days.

In 2020, the 26th FIS Ski Flying World Championships at Letalnica were originally scheduled for March, but the event was postponed to December due to the COVID-19 pandemic.

Events

List of world records 
A total of 28 official world records have been set at the hill.

{{Quote box | bgcolor = | salign=left | style=box-shadow: 10px 10px 5px #888888; border-radius: 25px; margin-left=10px; margin-bottom: 25px; | width=20% | quote=
«Without any doubt this is my greatest career and life achievement. Nothing can be compared with this world record. Not even my gold medal at the Olympics or the World Championships. Now I know how birds feel when they fly in the air.»
 |source= — Espen Bredesen, after setting the world record in 1994 (209 m)
}}

 Construction progress 

 K-point 

 Hill size 

Technical data
Specifications:

K-point – 200 m
Hill size – 240 m
inrun angle – 35.1°
inrun length – 133.8 m  
takeoff table height – 2.93 m
landing zone angle – 30.6° to 35.6°
takeoff table to bottom height – 135 m

In popular culture
Letalnica bratov Gorišek appeared as the main location of The Great Ecstasy of Woodcarver Steiner'', a German film directed by Werner Herzog which portrayed ski jumper Walter Steiner during the second KOP Ski Flying Week, held at Letalnica in 1974.

See also

Srednja Bloudkova 
Bloudkova velikanka
Planica Nordic Centre

References

External links
 Official website
 Planica Nordic Centre

Ski jumping venues in Slovenia
Ski flying venues
Sports venues completed in 1969
1969 establishments in Yugoslavia
Municipality of Kranjska Gora
Sport in the Alps